Royal FC de Muramvya or simply Royal is a football (soccer) club from Burundi based in Muramvya. Their home venue is 2,000 capacity Stade Municipal de Muramvya.

The team currently plays in Burundi Premier League the top level of Burundian football.

External links
Soccerway
M.fifa.com

Football clubs in Burundi